Lion in the Morning is the debut album by British Jamaican reggae musician Julian Marley, released in 1996 on Lightyear Entertainment.

Tracks
"Loving Clear" (3:54)
"Blossoming and Blooming" (4:13)
"Lion in the Morning" (3:57)
"Now You Know" (4:35)
"Babylon Cookie Jar" (4:23)
"Same Old Story" (3:49)
"Attack Back" (4:00)
"Arm Your Soul" (4:14)
"Ease These Pains" (3:31)
"When the Sun Comes Up" (3:52)
"Got to Be" (4:08)

1996 debut albums
Julian Marley albums